Christine Patton (born 18 March 1960) is a Bermudian sailor. She competed in the Yngling event at the 2004 Summer Olympics.

References

External links
 

1960 births
Living people
Bermudian female sailors (sport)
Olympic sailors of Bermuda
Sailors at the 2004 Summer Olympics – Yngling
Place of birth missing (living people)